Angela Dohrmann (born August 17, 1965) is an American actress and television personality. She grew up in Des Moines, Iowa.

She was a VJ for MuchMusic, the Canadian music video channel, in the early 1990s. She also pursued a career in acting, with a supporting role in the CBC Television sitcom Material World. After leaving MuchMusic, she returned to the United States and pursued acting roles, including guest appearances on Seinfeld (as Donna Chang in the episode "The Chinese Woman"), Ellen and Star Trek: Voyager, and recurring roles on The Drew Carey Show and Nash Bridges.

She currently teaches a course in comedy at Dickinson College in Carlisle, Pennsylvania.

External links
 

1965 births
Living people
Actresses from Des Moines, Iowa
Actresses from Los Angeles
American television actresses
Much (TV channel) personalities
VJs (media personalities)
21st-century American women